Frederick Tiedt (16 October 1935 – 15 June 1999, born in Dublin, Ireland) was an amateur and professional boxer.

Amateur career
Tiedt won a silver medal for Ireland at the 1956 Summer Olympics in Melbourne, Australia in the welterweight division.  Tiedt beat opponents from Poland, the United States, and Australia before losing a split decision to Nicolae Linca of Romania.  The following year Tiedt won a bronze medal at the European Amateur Boxing Championships in Prague.

Olympic results
Defeated Tadeusz Walasek (Poland) points
Defeated Pearce Allen Lane (United States) points
Defeated Kevin Hogarth (Australia) points
Lost to Nicolae Linca (Romania) points

Pro career
He turned professional in 1959 but his professional career was not as successful as his amateur career with a points victory over Al Sharpe to gain the Irish Welterweight Title the only highlight.  Tiedt finished with a record of 12 wins, 7 defeats and 2 ties.

Notable relative(s)
Tiedt is the uncle of Liam Mooney, a former rugby player and now an entrepreneur living in Dubai.

See also
 Ireland at the 1956 Summer Olympics
 Boxing at the 1956 Summer Olympics

External links
 
 
 

1935 births
1999 deaths
Welterweight boxers
Irish people of German descent
Olympic boxers of Ireland
Boxers at the 1956 Summer Olympics
Olympic silver medalists for Ireland
Sportspeople from Dublin (city)
Olympic medalists in boxing
Medalists at the 1956 Summer Olympics
Irish male boxers